Excalibur is a 1983 resource-management strategy video game for the Atari 8-bit family. It was designed by Chris Crawford and developed with the help of Larry Summers and Valerie Atkinson. Like Crawford's earlier Eastern Front (1941), Excalibur was published by the Atari Program Exchange.

Gameplay
The object of the game is to unite all of Britain under the rule of King Arthur. The players can invade kingdoms, set tithes for their vassals, send plagues and pestilences (with the help of Merlin) and manage the loyalty of their own Round Table by rewarding their knights or, if they grow too disloyal, by banishing them.

Reception
Electronic Games stated that "Excalibur is a grand effort". Antic stated that the game "easily ranks as the finest programming achievement to date by Chris Crawford ... one of the richest gaming experiences ever". Computer Gaming World in 1984 called Excalibur "a magnificent piece of software". It praised the documentation and novella, and concluded by asking, "When will Chris Crawford's next game be published?" In 1990, CGW gave the game four out of five stars, stating that "even on an obsolete machine" Excalibur was still worthwhile. In 1993, the magazine gave it three-plus stars out of five.

The Addison-Wesley Book of Atari Software 1984 gave Excalibur an overall A rating and stated that "those who persevere will find an ample reward in the game's incredible depth". The book predicted, however, that it was "destined to become a cult game ... appeal[ing] mainly to the seasoned wargamer or fantasy role-player" because of the slow pace and difficulty.

Crawford in 1984 wrote "My greatest regret, though, is that Excalibur has not won the attention that I think it deserves. This game is my magnum opus, much grander in scale than anything else I have done. It is a shame that so few people are even aware of its existence."

Legacy
In 1987, Crawford stated that Excalibur was one of the three games he was proud of, with Eastern Front and Balance of Power. In 2013, Crawford publicly released source code for several of his games, including Excalibur.

Reviews
Fantasy Gamer #5
 Casus Belli #26 (June 1985)

See also
Galahad and the Holy Grail

References

External links
Excalibur at Atari Mania

1983 video games
Atari 8-bit family games
Atari 8-bit family-only games
Atari Program Exchange software
Chris Crawford (game designer) games
Commercial video games with freely available source code
Strategy video games
Video games based on Arthurian legend
Video games developed in the United States
Single-player video games